ATIM may refer to:
 Announcement Traffic Indication Message, a control message in 802.11 wireless communication protocol
 Association of Translators and Interpreters of Manitoba
 Advanced Tissue Management application, a biobank management application.